Robert F. Barabe (June 14, 1917 – January 15, 1971) was an American politician who served as a member of the Wisconsin State Assembly and two-time mayor of Mellen, Wisconsin.

Early life and education
Barabe was born in Mellen, Wisconsin. He attended the University of Wisconsin.

Career 
During World War II, Barabe served in the 10th Armored Division (3rd Tank Battalion) of the United States Army and he later became a member of the American Legion. and the Veterans of Foreign Wars. During his service in WWII he earned 2 Bronze Stars.

Barabe was elected to the Assembly in 1958 and was re-elected in 1960 and 1962. Previously, he was a member of the Ashland County, Wisconsin Board from 1947 to 1949 and Mayor of Mellen from 1955 to 1959 and 1969 to 1971, as well as an alderman in Mellen. He was a member of the Democratic Party.

Personal life 
Barabe has a son, Joseph Barabe, who also served two stints as mayor of Mellen, from 1987 to 2001 and 2003 to 2022. Joseph Barabe is also a member of the Democratic Party.

Barabe died of a heart attack while serving as mayor on January 15, 1971.

References

People from Ashland County, Wisconsin
Mayors of places in Wisconsin
Military personnel from Wisconsin
United States Army soldiers
United States Army personnel of World War II
University of Wisconsin–Madison alumni
1917 births
1971 deaths
20th-century American politicians
Democratic Party members of the Wisconsin State Assembly